Baglan Mailybayev (Bağlan Asaubaiūly Mailybaev) was born on 20 May 1975 in Zhambyl region, Kazakhstan. His nationality is Kazakh. He is a politician of the Republic of Kazakhstan, Deputy Head of the Presidential Administration of the Republic of Kazakhstan, Doctor of Law (2002) (under the supervision of Professor Zimanov S.Z. – scientific advisor and academician of National Academy of Sciences of the Republic of Kazakhstan) and PhD in political science (1998).

Biography 

In 1996 he obtained a bachelor's degree in journalism from the Kazakh State National University named after Al-Farabi.

In 1998 he was awarded a degree of PhD in political science after graduating from a graduate school of Political Science and Political Administration of the Russian Academy of Public Administration under the president of the Russian Federation.

Between 1998 and 2002 he used to work as a senior researcher at the Institute of State and Law of the National Academy of Sciences of the Republic of Kazakhstan as well as a lecturer at the Kazakh State University of International Relations and World Languages named after Abylai Khan.

Between February and May 2002 he worked as the Head of Mass Media Department of the Ministry of Culture, Information and Public Accord of the Republic of Kazakhstan.

Between May 2002 and September 2003 he was a President of the Joint Stock Company "Republican newspaper "Kazakhstanskaya Pravda"".

Between September 2003 and December 2004 he was a President of the Joint Stock Company "Zan".

Since December 2004 he had served as the Head of the Press office of the President of the Republic of Kazakhstan.

Since October 2008 he had been a Chairman of the Committee of Information and Archives of Ministry of Culture and Information of the Republic of Kazakhstan.

Since December 2008 he had been a Vice Minister of Culture and Information of the Republic of Kazakhstan.

Between June 2009 and October 2011 he worked as Press Secretary of the President of the Republic of Kazakhstan.

In October 2011 he was appointed as a Deputy Head of the Presidential Administration of the Republic of Kazakhstan by the Presidential decree.

Personal life

Marital status: He is married and has two children.

Awards 
Baglan Mailybayev was awarded "Kurmet", "Parasat" orders, medals and a letter of acknowledgement of the President of the Republic of Kazakhstan. In 1998 he became a prizewinner at the award of Young Scientists of National Academy of Sciences of the Republic of Kazakhstan.

Publications 

He is the author of 4 monographs and more than 150 scientific publications, published in Kazakhstani as well as in foreign editions. He is also the author of a number of feature stories, supervisor and a scriptwriter of television projects and documentaries.

Research interests 

Comparative Political Science, Theory of State and Law, History of State and Law, Constitutional Law.
Language abilities: He speaks Kazakh, Russian and English fluently.

Note 
The predecessor of Baglan Mailybayev at the position of a Deputy Head of the Presidential Administration of the Republic of Kazakhstan was Maulen Ashimbayev.

References

1975 births
Living people
Nur Otan politicians